Chrysauge kadenii is a species of snout moth in the genus Chrysauge. It was described by Julius Lederer, 1863. It is found in Brazil.

References

Moths described in 1863
Chrysauginae